Mehrumal Jagwani (also Mehro Mal) was a Hindu politician from Sindh who served five consecutive terms in the provincial assembly from 1985 to 2002.

Politics 
Mal won five consecutive elections to the Provincial Assembly of Sindh in 1985, 1988, 1990, 1993, and 1997 as one of the five representatives from the Hindu community.

References 

Pakistani politicians
Politicians from Sindh
Hindu communities of Pakistan